Sir Peter Lely (14 September 1618 – 7 December 1680) was a painter of Dutch origin whose career was nearly all spent in England, where he became the dominant portrait painter to the court. He became a naturalised British subject and was knighted in 1679.

Life 
Lely was born Pieter van der Faes to Dutch parents in Soest in Westphalia, where his father was an officer serving in the armed forces of the Elector of Brandenburg. Lely studied painting in Haarlem, where he may have been apprenticed to Pieter de Grebber.  He became a master of the Guild of Saint Luke in Haarlem in 1637. He is reputed to have adopted the surname "Lely" (also occasionally spelled Lilly) from a heraldic lily on the gable of the house where his father was born in The Hague.

He arrived in London in around 1643, His early English paintings, mainly mythological or religious scenes, or portraits set in a pastoral landscape, show influences from Anthony van Dyck and the Dutch baroque.
Lely's portraits were well received, and he succeeded Anthony van Dyck (who had died in 1641) as the most fashionable portrait artist in England. He became a freeman of the Painter-Stainers' Company in 1647 and was portrait artist to Charles I. His talent ensured that his career was not interrupted by Charles's execution, and he served Oliver Cromwell, whom he painted "warts and all", and Richard Cromwell. In the years around 1650 the poet Sir Richard Lovelace wrote two poems about Lely – Peinture and "See what a clouded majesty ..."

After the English Restoration in 1660, Lely was appointed as Charles II's Principal Painter in Ordinary in 1661, with a stipend of £200 per year, as Van Dyck had enjoyed in the previous Stuart reign.
Lely became a naturalised English subject in 1662. The young Robert Hooke came to London to follow an apprenticeship with Lely before being given a place at Westminster School by Richard Busby.

Demand was high, and Lely and his large workshop were prolific.

After Lely painted a sitter's head, Lely's pupils would often complete the portrait in one of a series of numbered poses. As a result, Lely is the first English painter who has left "an enormous mass of work", although the quality of studio pieces is variable. As Brian Sewell put it:

Among his most famous paintings are a series of 10 portraits of ladies from the Royal court, known as the Windsor Beauties, formerly at Windsor Castle but now at Hampton Court Palace; a similar series for Althorp; a series of 12 of the admirals and captains who fought in the Second Anglo-Dutch War, known as the "Flagmen of Lowestoft", now mostly owned by the National Maritime Museum in Greenwich; and his Susannah and the Elders at Burghley House.

His most famous non-portrait work is probably Nymphs by a Fountain in Dulwich Picture Gallery.

Lely played a significant role in introducing the mezzotint to Britain, as he realized its possibilities for publicising his portraits.  He encouraged Dutch mezzotinters to come to Britain to copy his work, laying the foundations for the English mezzotint tradition.

Lely lived from about 1651 to 1680 at No. 10-11 Great Piazza, Covent Garden. He was knighted in 1679. Lely died soon afterwards at his easel in Covent Garden, while painting a portrait of the Duchess of Somerset. Sir Peter was buried at St Paul's Church, Covent Garden.

Legacy 

In his lifetime, Lely was known as a skillful connoisseur of art. His collection of Old Masters, including Veronese, Titian, Claude Lorrain and Rubens, and a fabulous collection of drawings, was broken up and sold after his death, raising the immense sum of £26,000. Some items in it which had been acquired by Lely from the Commonwealth dispersal of Charles I's art collections, such as the Lely Venus, were re-acquired by the Royal Collection.

He was replaced as court portraitist by Sir Godfrey Kneller, also a German-born Dutchman, whose style drew from Lely's but reflecting later Continental trends.  

A horse was also named after him, finishing fourth in the 1996 Grand National.

Style 
Lely was first and foremost a portraitist. He painted both men and women, but with a greater inclination towards the latter, whose cleavage was often accentuated, sometimes to the point of having one breast fully exposed (such as in Margaret Hughes's earlier portrait, seen below).

The loss in 1929 of a "family portrait by Sir Peter Lely" was reported in the fire at Pit House, Farley Heath, Albury.

Gallery

Citations

General references 
 
 
 
  The entry includes a bibliography.

External links 

 The Oliver Millar Archive; research papers of Oliver Millar, British art historian and a leading authority on Peter Lely
 
 Self-portrait from the National Portrait Gallery
 Biography from the J. Paul Getty Museum
 Biography from the National Maritime Museum, Greenwich
 Biography from the Web Gallery of Art
 Sir Peter Lely at the WikiGallery.org
 History collection from Frits Lugt's Les marques de collections de dessins & d'estampes
 Nympths by a Fountain from the Dulwich Picture Gallery

1618 births
1680 deaths
People from Soest, Germany
17th-century English painters
English male painters
Knights Bachelor
British Baroque painters
Principal Painters in Ordinary
Dutch Golden Age painters
Dutch male painters
Painters from Haarlem
German emigrants to the Dutch Republic
Dutch emigrants to the Kingdom of England
Naturalised citizens of the United Kingdom